Adobe Canyon is a valley and tributary stream of Del Puerto Creek in Stanislaus County, California.

References 

Valleys of Stanislaus County, California
Diablo Range
Geography of the San Joaquin Valley
Rivers of Stanislaus County, California
Tributaries of the San Joaquin River
Rivers of Northern California
La Vereda del Monte